St. Andrew's Episcopal Church is a parish of the Episcopal Church in Kansas City, Missouri, in the Diocese of West Missouri. The church is located on the southwest corner of Meyer Boulevard and Wornall Road in Kansas City, Missouri. The Reverend John Spicer is rector. The Reverend Anne Hutcherson is associate rector emeritus. The Reverend Jean Long is the associate rector. The Reverend Rita Carson Kendagor is the assistant rector. The deacons are the Venerable Bruce Bower and the Reverend Adam James. St. Andrew's holds worship services with Eucharist four times every week. The church has approximately 1,500 members and welcomes all people to worship.

The rector, associate rector emeritus, associate rector, assistant rector, and deacons are the spiritual leaders at St. Andrew's. An 18-member vestry, led by a senior warden and junior warden, serves as lay leaders. William Aliber is the current Senior Warden and Susan Paynter serves as Junior Warden. The vestry and clergy share mutual responsibility for establishing and fulfilling the church's mission and vision. Six vestry members are elected for a three-year term each year in January at an all-parish meeting. Nominations take place in the summer prior to the January election.

Rectors
Jun 2012–present: the Reverend John Spicer
Fr. Spicer has been rector of St. Andrew's since June 2012. He was previously the church's associate rector (2005–2011) and was called by the vestry and diocesan bishop, the Rt. Rev. Barry R. Howe, be priest-in-charge effective July 1, 2011, upon the retirement of the Reverend Frederick "Fred" Mann. On May 15, 2012, the vestry unanimously voted to call Fr. Spicer as rector. Subsequently, the new diocesan bishop, the Rt. Rev. Martin S. Field, approved the call, and Fr. Spicer accepted the call during the parish's worship on June 3, 2012.

Jan 2004-Jun 2011: the Reverend Frederick "Fred" Mann

History
The current church building is the fourth parish house for St. Andrew's.

1913 - St. Andrew's Mission held its first church service on January 19 in the home of Rev. Charles Weed, Rector, and Mrs. Weed. Twenty-three people attended the first service. Having outgrown the Weed's home, services moved a few weeks later to 59th and Brookside Boulevard, where they were held in a back room of Fred Wolferman's grocery that adjoined his stables. Clopping horses' hooves and whinnies mixed with the Epistle and Holy Gospel. Later in 1913, the congregation built a small, white one-room chapel that seat 100 people. The communion rail was long enough for just seven people. Members rejoiced if it was filled three times at a service.

1916 - St. Andrew's acquired its current property at Wornall Road and Meyer Boulevard for $11,000 ($177,000 in 2010). Communicants besieged the Rector for buying property so far into the country to where nothing was in sight but a man and a plow. But, he had foreseen southward growth of the city.

1922 - With World War I over, St. Andrew's could finally break ground on the first church built at Wornall and Meyer. The "little brown church" was built in an English Gothic style on the south end of the property. Some called it "The Good Shepherd Chapel," in hommage to the Church of the Good Shepherd, as St. Andrew's was known between 1913 and 1916. The cost for the new church was $20,000 ($270,000 in 2010). The first service was Easter Day 1923.

1931 - Bishop Spencer laid the cornerstone of the second church to be built at Wornall and Meyer that would seat 384. The brown stucco church was originally intended to last only 10–12 years, but ended up being the home of St. Andrew's for 20 years. Our altar and pulpit were first housed in this building. The first service took place on a rainy day in fall 1931 - the roof leaked.

1945 - St. Andrew's formed a building committee to begin working on the church that stands today.

1946 - The first fund drive for the new building raised $158,400 ($1,050,000 in 2010), four years before ground breaking.

1950 - After more successful fund drives, the vestry voted to begin construction of the current church building. The estimated cost was $525,000 ($3,100,000 in 2010). An accelerated fund drive was launched to raise the additional money needed. Groundbreaking was on June 18. The Good Shepherd Chapel was torn down to make way for the new church.

1952 - The church we know today held its first service on March 30. What is now the Jewell Room was a terrace and the main entrance to the new church.

1973 - St. Andrew's began a new fund drive for an expansion that was considered vital to the long-term future of St. Andrew's. Parishioners raised $740,000 ($2,100,000 in 2010) to build the Jewell Room, bride's room, parish offices, library, Undercroft, Auxiliary Room and Wornall Road entrance. Construction was completed in 1974. With this new funding, St. Andrew's was also able to purchase six homes that stood immediately south of the church. They were rented for many years before being moved by Habitat for Humanity in the early 1990s to make room for the parking lot.

1990 - St. Andrew's purchased the former YMCA building across the street from the church to use as a youth center and renamed it "HJ's" in honor of the son of the parishioner who donated the funds for the building.

2006 - Allison Fikejs is hired as soprano soloist. 

2010 - St. Andrew's parishioners pledged $1,600,000 to Rebuild, Restore and Renew the nearly 60-year-old church building.

2013 - St. Andrew's will celebrate its 100th anniversary on January 13.

2014 - Dr. Thomas R. Vozzella is hired as Director of Music, Organist and Choir Director.

References

External link
 

Churches in Kansas City, Missouri
Episcopal church buildings in Missouri
Churches completed in 1952
Christian organizations established in 1913
1913 establishments in Missouri